Frysztak  is a village in the Gmina Frysztak, Strzyżów County, Subcarpathian Voivodeship, Poland,  from Krosno. Frysztak lies in historic Lesser Poland. It is located on a hillock near the river Wisłok, on the road from Rzeszów to Krosno.

History
Frysztak was mentioned in a 1259AD document as a town with Magdeburg Rights given by King Bolesław V the Chaste and named after the German Freistadt, literally "Freestead". For centuries, it was a private town, administratively located in the Sandomierz Voivodeship in the Lesser Poland Province.

In 1474, the town was completely destroyed by Hungarian army of King Matthias Corvinus, after which Frysztak declined. Its German-speaking population of the Walddeutsche became Polonized in the course of the time.

The Hasidic leader Rabbi Menachem Mendel of Rimanov (1745–1815) lived and worked there for many years. In 1772, it was annexed by Austria in the First Partition of Poland and included within its newly formed province of Galicia. Following World War I, Poland regained independence and control of the town. Frysztak was stripped of its town charter due to population decline in 1932. Its residents twice tried to change this decision (in 1952 and 1975), but without success.

Following the joint German-Soviet invasion of Poland, which started World War II in September 1939, it was occupied by Germany. Its Jewish population was concentrated in the Frysztak Ghetto and eventually murdered by the occupiers during the Holocaust. A preserved remnant of the local Jewish minority is the Old Jewish Cemetery.

Notable people
Mikołaj Frysztacki Radwan  15th century Knight of King Władysław III of Poland participated in the battle of Varna.
Gen. Ludwik de Laveaux (1891–1969)
The Rev. Dr. Jan Biedroń, Rector of the major Seminary in Sandomierz and Canon of the cathedral at "Gremialny".
 Maj. Edwin Wagner, Polish politician and, major of the Infantry Division of the Polish Army.
Dr Pawel Wildstein (1920–2008)
Prof. Dr. Emil Orzechowski (born 1944), theatre academic and cultural scientist.

References

Villages in Strzyżów County
Shtetls
1366 establishments in Europe
Populated places established in the 1360s
Lesser Poland
Lwów Voivodeship
Holocaust locations in Poland
14th-century establishments in Poland